From Parts Unknown is the seventh studio album by American metalcore band Every Time I Die.

Recording and composition
From Parts Unknown was recorded over the course of a month with Kurt Ballou of Converge at GodCity Studio in Salem, Massachusetts in March 2014. Vocalist Keith Buckley said Ballou "always intimidated the living shit out of me, so I was overjoyed when the decision was made to record our next record with him". The band were massive fans of Converge, with guitarist Jordan Buckley stating that the band would not exist if not for Converge. He said they "went into recording thinking, 'Let's not pretend to be too cool. We can learn so much from him'". Keith said that working with Ballou was "stressful in the best way, like when your dad comes to watch you play baseball for the first time and you just want to make him proud". Ballou challenged the band to push themselves to make heavy but catchy songs. Buckley had contracted laryngitis, which had caused him to track the majority of his vocals in one day.

According to Buckley, "Instead of making something that the kids can all sing along to," the group wanted to create "music that scares them". According to Blabbermouth.net, the album title was "initially inspired by a term used by wrestlers to increase their mystique, It ultimately references the more hopeful mood that creeped into the album's lyrics during songwriting." Buckley said he didn't "realize I had that more positive outlook in me".

Release
On May 19, 2014, From Parts Unknown was announced for release, and its track listing and artwork was revealed. In addition, a music video was released for "Thirst". According to themusic, the video features "two dudes running roughshod through and at the outskirts of a city on their way to a house party". From Parts Unknown was made available for streaming on June 16, before being released on July 1 through Epitaph Records. In January 2015, the band went on a tour of Australia with Touché Amoré. In April and May, the group supported The Used on their headlining US tour. In November and December, the band supported August Burns Red on their headlining US tour.

Reception

Upon its release, From Parts Unknown was met with critical acclaim from music critics. According to Metacritic, where they assign a weighted average score out of 100 to ratings and reviews from mainstream critics, the album received an average of 92, based on 6 reviews, indicating "universal acclaim". Drew Beringer of AbsolutePunk called the record "desperate, ferocious, and raw." James Monger of AllMusic wrote "Every Time I Die have established themselves as one of the more reliable and relatable ... acts to come out of the genre, not to mention one of the most discernable, and the commanding From Parts Unknown does nothing to tarnish that reputation." Jason Pettigrew of Alternative Press wrote, "This band may be close to two decades and seven albums in, but in these here Parts, Every Time I Die are coming out of the box like airborne wolverines lunging for the world’s carotid arteries." Jacob Royal of Sputnikmusic claimed "it’s commendable enough for the band to switch gears once having gotten to cruise control, and this record makes it clear that change was the main thing they sought." The album was included at number 14 on Rock Sounds "Top 50 Albums of the Year" list. The album was included at number 27 on Kerrang!s "The Top 50 Rock Albums Of 2014" list.

The album charted at number 22 on the Billboard 200 chart, selling around 12,000 copies in its first week.

Track listing

Personnel

Every Time I Die
 Keith Buckley – vocals
 Jordan Buckley – guitar
 Andrew Williams – guitar
 Ryan Leger – drums
 Stephen Micciche – bass

Production
 Kurt Ballou – producer, recording, mixing
 Jay Zubricky – pre-production
 Alan Douches – mastering
 Alex Garcia-Rivera – drum tech
 Joby J. Ford – artwork

Charts

References
Citations

Sources

External links

Every Time I Die albums
2014 albums
Epitaph Records albums
Albums produced by Kurt Ballou